The Blaster (also called the "BMW Flamethrower") was a 1998 invention by South African inventor Charl Fourie as an car-mounted laterally-firing flamethrower, designed to provide a defence against carjackings.

The Blaster was a liquefied petroleum gas flamethrower installed along the sides of the vehicle under the doors. Should a group of carjackers suddenly attack the vehicle while it is stopped in traffic (the typical scenario), the occupant could flip a switch and direct  plumes of flame upward into the facial area of anyone trying to enter the vehicle through the doors or windows. Fourie claimed it was unlikely to kill but would "definitely blind" the assailant. In South Africa, it is legal to use lethal force in self-defence if in fear of one's life, and ownership of flamethrowers is unrestricted.

The invention came in response to the increasingly severe violent crime situation in South Africa, which in 1998 had already made the country (particularly Johannesburg) the per capita murder, assault, rape and carjacking capital of the world. 

The device was controversial in South Africa, with some, including the Automobile Association of South Africa, speculating that the device might cause more carjackers to simply murder drivers with gunfire as a precautionary measure before approaching the vehicle, a tactic which was already fairly common.

The device was not banned (as is sometimes reported), but the high price tag at 3,900 rand ($655) limited its market and made it unprofitable. By 2001, only a few hundred had been sold, and the device was taken off the market by Fourie, who instead started marketing a less expensive pocket-sized "personal flamethrower". 

The Blaster received ample (and often satirical) media coverage from abroad. In particular, it earned its inventor the 1999 Ig Nobel Peace Prize (a parody of the real Nobel Prizes).

See also 
List of flamethrowers

References

External links 
 BBC News report

Automotive accessories
Flamethrowers
South African inventions